Barama College is one of the oldest institutes for higher education at Barama in Baksa district of Assam. The college is affiliated to Bodoland University.

Academic
Science
 HSSLC (Higher Secondary School Leaving Certificate) or (10+2)
 Bachelor of Science
 B.Sc in Physics
 B.Sc in Chemistry
 B.Sc in Mathematics
 B.Sc in Zoology
 B.Sc in Botany
Arts
 HSSLC (Higher Secondary School Leaving Certificate) or (10+2)
Bachelor of Arts
 B.A. in Bodo
 B.A. in Assamese
 B.A. in English
 B.A. in philosophy
 B.A. in Economics
 B.A. in history
 B.A. in Political science
 B.A. in philosophy

 Master of Arts Distance learning
 M.A. in Assamese
 M.A. in Bodo
 M.A. in English
 M.A. in History
 M.A. in Economics
 M.A. in philosophy
 M.A./M.Sc in Mathematics
 M. Com

The institute also offers Masters in communication and journalism (MCJ/PGDJMC), PG Diploma in Sales and Marketing Management (PGDSMM), PG Diploma in Business Management (PGDBM), PG Diploma in Finance Management (PGDFM), PG Diploma in Insurance and Risk Management PGDIM), PG Diploma in Banking and Finance Services (PGDBFS) and PG Diploma in Computer Application (PGDCA).

Accreditation
In 2016 the college has been awarded 'B+' grade by National Assessment and Accreditation Council (NAAC). The college is also recognised by University Grants Commission (India).

References

External links
 Official website

Colleges affiliated to Gauhati University
1971 establishments in Assam
Baksa district
Educational institutions established in 1971